Healey may refer to:

People
 Chadwyck-Healey baronets, an English baronetcy seated in Surrey
 Healey (surname), people with the surname Healey
 Healey Willan (1880-1968), Anglo-Canadian composer

Places in England
 Healey, Greater Manchester
 Healey, Northumberland
 Healey, North Yorkshire
 Healey, Kirklees, West Yorkshire
 Healey, Ossett, Wakefield, West Yorkshire
 Healey Nab, an area of countryside east of Chorley, Lancashire

Other uses
 Healey (automobile), various car manufacturers and models bearing the Healey name
 Healey Building, a skyscraper in Atlanta, Georgia, U.S.
 T. J. Healey

See also
 
 Healy (disambiguation)
 Heeley (disambiguation)